Derbyshire County Cricket Club in 1911 represents the cricket season when the English club Derbyshire had been playing for forty years. It was their seventeenth season in the County Championship and, winning two matches, the side ended fourteenth in the Championship table, staying just off the bottom.

1911 season

Derbyshire CCC played eighteen games in the County Championship in 1911 and no other matches. The captain for the year was John Chapman in his second season as captain. Samuel Cadman was top scorer with two centuries, although Chapman, who was not out five times ended with a better average. Arnold Warren  took 79 wickets.

Archibald Slater and John Corbet  made their debuts for the side as did Archibald Wickstead and  Arthur Wood  who only played two seasons. Eric Murray also made his debut but returned to South Africa at the end of the season. Charles Freeman, William Webster and Frederick Forman  all played one game each which were their only appearances for Derbyshire.

Matches

{| class="wikitable" width="100%"
! bgcolor="#efefef" colspan=6 | List of  matches
|- bgcolor="#efefef"
!No.
!Date
!V
!Result 
!Margin
!Notes
|- 
|1
|15 May 1911 
|Yorkshire  Bramall Lane, Sheffield 
|bgcolor="#FF0000"|Lost
|Innings and 47 runs
| Rhodes 100; A Warren 6-99; Hirst 6-26
|- 
|2
| 22 May 1911 
|Lancashire   Old Trafford, Manchester 
|bgcolor="#00FF00"|Won
|2 runs
| A Warren 7-61 
|- 
|3
|25 May 1911 
|Yorkshire  Queen's Park, Chesterfield 
|bgcolor="#FF0000"|Lost
|Innings and 75 runs
| Denton 113; Drake 147*; Rhodes 7-16
|- 
|4
| 01 Jun 1911 
|HampshireCounty Ground, Southampton 
|bgcolor="#FF0000"|Lost
|20 runs
| C B Fry 150; A Morton 101; L Oliver 101; T Forrester 6-30; Evans 6-81
|- 
|5
| 05 Jun 1911 
| Essex  County Ground, Leyton 
|bgcolor="#FF0000"|Lost
|9 Wickets
| SWA Cadman 103 and 5-133; Gillingham 128; Buckenham 6-118;
|- 
|6
| 08 Jun 1911 
| Northamptonshire  County Ground, Northampton
|bgcolor="#00FF00"|Won
|59 Runs
| A Warren 6-88; T Forrester 6-39
 |- 
|7
|12 Jun 1911 
|Surrey  County Ground, Derby 
|bgcolor="#FF0000"|Lost
|Innings and 13 runs
| Hayes 109; Smith 7-62
|- 
|8
| 19 Jun 1911 
| Warwickshire  Miners Welfare Ground, Blackwell 
|bgcolor="#FF0000"|Lost
|14 runs
| A Warren 6-64 and 5-74; Field 5-52; 
|- 
|9
| 22 Jun 1911 
|Leicestershire Aylestone Road, Leicester 
|bgcolor="#FFCC00"|Drawn
|
| A Warren 6-98;
|- 
|10
| 26 Jun 1911 
|HampshireAt County Ground, Derby 
|bgcolor="#FF0000"|Lost
|5 Wickets
| Kennedy 5-46 and 5-38
|- 
|11
| 01 Jul 1911 
|Northamptonshire  Queen's Park, Chesterfield
|bgcolor="#FF0000"|Lost
|107 runs
| A Warren 5-55; Thompson 5-41 and 6-65
|- 
|12
| 13 Jul 1911 
|Lancashire   County Ground, Derby 
|bgcolor="#FF0000"|Lost
|Innings and 141 runs
| W Tyldesley 152; J Tyldesley 125; Sharp 5-14; Dean 6-104
|- 
|13
| 24 Jul 1911 
|SurreyKennington Oval 
|bgcolor="#FF0000"|Lost
|Innings and 214 runs
| Hayward 202; Bush 135; Goatly 105; SWA Cadman 5-133; T Forrester 5-161; Hitch 7-72; Rushby 5-52 
|- 
|14
| 29 Jul 1911 
|LeicestershireQueen's Park, Chesterfield 
|bgcolor="#FFCC00"|Drawn
|
| Sharp 216; SWA Cadman 116
|- 
|15
| 07 Aug 1911 
| Essex  County Ground, Derby  
|bgcolor="#FF0000"|Lost
|7 Wickets
| Buckenham 5-76 
|- 
|16
| 10 Aug 1911 
| Warwickshire   Edgbaston, Birmingham 
|bgcolor="#FF0000"|Lost
|165 runs
| W Quaife 144; T Forrester 6-68; Field 5-96; Foster 6-37
|- 
|17
| 14 Aug 1911 
| Nottinghamshire   Trent Bridge, Nottingham 
|bgcolor="#FFCC00"|Drawn
|
| Hardstaff 118; E Needham103; Iremonger 6-67; A Warren 6-131
|- 
|18
| 26 Aug 1911 
| Nottinghamshire  Miners Welfare Ground, Blackwell 
|bgcolor="#FF0000"|Lost
|6 Wickets
| Wass 5-70; Iremonger 5-78; A Morton 9-71; 
|

Statistics

County Championship batting averages

County Championship bowling averages

County Championship Wicket Keeping
J Humphries 	Catches 36, Stumpings 11

See also
Derbyshire County Cricket Club seasons
1911 English cricket season

References

1911 in English cricket
Derbyshire County Cricket Club seasons
English cricket seasons in the 20th century